Suyermetovo (Söyärmät) is a rural locality (a selo) and the administrative centre of Kyzyl-Yarsky Selsoviet, Yermekeyevsky District, Bashkortostan, Russia. The population was 166 as of 2010. There is 1 street.

Geography 
Suyermetovo is located 15 km northwest of Yermekeyevo (the district's administrative centre) by road. Shalty is the nearest rural locality.

References 

Rural localities in Yermekeyevsky District